The meridian 114° west of Greenwich is a line of longitude that extends from the North Pole across the Arctic Ocean, North America, the Pacific Ocean, the Southern Ocean, and Antarctica to the South Pole.

114°W is the Fifth Meridian of the Dominion Land Survey in Canada.

The 114th meridian west forms a great circle with the 66th meridian east.

From Pole to Pole
Starting at the North Pole and heading south to the South Pole, the 114th meridian west passes through:

{| class="wikitable plainrowheaders"
! scope="col" width="130" | Co-ordinates
! scope="col" | Country, territory or sea
! scope="col" | Notes
|-
| style="background:#b0e0e6;" | 
! scope="row" style="background:#b0e0e6;" | Arctic Ocean
| style="background:#b0e0e6;" |
|-
| 
! scope="row" | 
| Northwest Territories — Brock Island
|-
| style="background:#b0e0e6;" | 
! scope="row" style="background:#b0e0e6;" | Ballantyne Strait
| style="background:#b0e0e6;" |
|-valign="top"
| style="background:#b0e0e6;" | 
! scope="row" style="background:#b0e0e6;" | Unnamed waterbody
| style="background:#b0e0e6;" | Passing just west of Fitzwilliam Owen Island, Northwest Territories,  (at )
|-
| 
! scope="row" | 
| Northwest Territories — Emerald Isle
|-
| style="background:#b0e0e6;" | 
! scope="row" style="background:#b0e0e6;" | Unnamed waterbody
| style="background:#b0e0e6;" |
|-
| 
! scope="row" | 
| Northwest Territories — Melville Island
|-
| style="background:#b0e0e6;" | 
! scope="row" style="background:#b0e0e6;" | Murray Inlet
| style="background:#b0e0e6;" |
|-
| style="background:#b0e0e6;" | 
! scope="row" style="background:#b0e0e6;" | Liddon Gulf
| style="background:#b0e0e6;" |
|-
| 
! scope="row" | 
| Northwest Territories — Melville Island
|-
| style="background:#b0e0e6;" | 
! scope="row" style="background:#b0e0e6;" | M'Clure Strait
| style="background:#b0e0e6;" |
|-
| style="background:#b0e0e6;" | 
! scope="row" style="background:#b0e0e6;" | Parry Channel
| style="background:#b0e0e6;" | Viscount Melville Sound
|-
| 
! scope="row" | 
| Northwest Territories — Victoria Island
|-
| style="background:#b0e0e6;" | 
! scope="row" style="background:#b0e0e6;" | Richard Collinson Inlet
| style="background:#b0e0e6;" |
|-
| 
! scope="row" | 
| Northwest Territories — Victoria Island
|-
| style="background:#b0e0e6;" | 
! scope="row" style="background:#b0e0e6;" | Prince Albert Sound
| style="background:#b0e0e6;" |
|-valign="top"
| 
! scope="row" | 
|-
| style="background:#b0e0e6;" | 
! scope="row" style="background:#b0e0e6;" | Dolphin and Union Strait
| style="background:#b0e0e6;" |
|-
| 
! scope="row" | 
| Nunavut — mainland
|-
| style="background:#b0e0e6;" | 
! scope="row" style="background:#b0e0e6;" | Coronation Gulf
| style="background:#b0e0e6;" |
|-valign="top"
| 
! scope="row" | 
|-valign="top"
| 
! scope="row" | 
| Montana Idaho — from  Utah — from  Arizona — from 
|-
| 
! scope="row" | 
| Sonora
|-
| style="background:#b0e0e6;" | 
! scope="row" style="background:#b0e0e6;" | Gulf of California
| style="background:#b0e0e6;" | 
|-valign="top"
| 
! scope="row" | 
| Baja California Baja California Sur — from 
|-
| style="background:#b0e0e6;" | 
! scope="row" style="background:#b0e0e6;" | Pacific Ocean
| style="background:#b0e0e6;" |
|-
| style="background:#b0e0e6;" | 
! scope="row" style="background:#b0e0e6;" | Southern Ocean
| style="background:#b0e0e6;" |
|-
| 
! scope="row" | Antarctica
| Unclaimed territory
|-
|}

See also
113th meridian west
115th meridian west

w114 meridian west